Saint-Jean-Chrysostome Aerodrome  is located  southeast of the Saint-Jean-Chrysostome district of Lévis, Quebec, Canada. It is a private use facility.

References

 aeroportstjeanchrysostome.ca

Parachuting in Canada
Registered aerodromes in Chaudière-Appalaches